Molla Bodagh (also Romanized as Mollā Bodāgh; also known as Mollā Bodākh and Mūlla Badaq) is a village in Sardrud-e Olya Rural District, Sardrud District, Razan County, Hamadan Province, Iran. At the 2006 census, its population was 2,589, in 540 families.

References 

Populated places in Razan County